The 1994 Porsche Tennis Grand Prix was a women's tennis tournament played on indoor hard courts at the Filderstadt Tennis Centre in Filderstadt, Germany and was part of the Tier II of the 1994 WTA Tour. It was the 17th edition of the tournament and was held from 10 October to 16 October 1994. Eighth-seeded Anke Huber won the singles title and earned $80,000 first-prize money as well as 300 ranking points.

Finals

Singles
 Anke Huber defeated  Mary Pierce 6–4, 6–2
 It was Huber's 2nd singles title of the year and the 5th of her career.

Doubles
 Gigi Fernández /  Natasha Zvereva defeated  Manon Bollegraf /  Larisa Savchenko 7–6(7–5), 6–4

Prize money

References

External links
 Official website 
 ITF tournament edition details
 Tournament draws

Porsche Tennis Grand Prix
Porsche Tennis Grand Prix
1994 in German tennis
1990s in Baden-Württemberg
Porsch